Schowonda Williams (born December 3, 1966) is an American hurdler. She competed in the women's 400 metres hurdles at the 1988 Summer Olympics.

References

External links
 

1966 births
Living people
Athletes (track and field) at the 1988 Summer Olympics
American female hurdlers
Olympic track and field athletes of the United States
Goodwill Games medalists in athletics
Place of birth missing (living people)
Competitors at the 1990 Goodwill Games
21st-century American women